Ewa Kucińska (born 2 April 1962) is a Polish diver. She competed in the women's 10 metre platform event at the 1980 Summer Olympics, placing 13th in the diving event.

References

External links
 

1962 births
Living people
Polish female divers
Olympic divers of Poland
Divers at the 1980 Summer Olympics
Sportspeople from Gorzów Wielkopolski